Carlston Lindsay Harris (born July 9, 1987) is a Guyanese mixed martial artist who competes in the Welterweight division of the Ultimate Fighting Championship.

Background
Having left Guyana in 2007 in search of better job prospects, Harris moved to Manaus, Brazil, working as a mechanic. Treating boxing and luta livre as a hobby, he decided to make martial arts his full time job after buying a pirated DVD of the first B.J. Penn and Diego Sanchez bout. Soon after, his coach, Junior Lopes, suggested that Harris move to Rio de Janeiro and continue his MMA training.

He is the first Guyanese fighter in the UFC.

Mixed martial arts career

Early career 
Making his MMA debut in 2011, Harris started his MMA career losing a split decision to Christiano Marques. Two months later, Harris scored his first MMA victory submitting Bruno Renascer in the first round, followed by another decision loss in March 2012. Turning his career around, he put on a winning streak after his 1-2 start and defeated the likes of Michel Pereira, Joilton Lutterbach, and Wellington Turman to get noticed by Brave Combat Federation.

Brave Combat Federation 
Making his debut on the Brave CF 3 card on March 18, 2017 against Thiago Vieira, Harris won the bout via TKO stoppage in the second round.
	
In his sophomore performance, Harris would go on to defeat Carl Booth via unanimous decision at Brave CF 8 on August 12, 2017 to win the BRAVE CF Welterweight Championship.

In his first defence off the title , Harris faced  Jarrah Hussein Al-Silawi at Brave CF 16 on September 21, 2018. He lost the bout and the title via TKO in the first round.

Return to Regional Scene 
Winning his first bout back in Brazil with the promotion Shooto Brazil against Claudio Rocha via stoppage in the first round. Harris faced Alex Santos at Shooto Brazil 101 on September 27, 2020, Harris winning the bout after knocking out his opponent in the second round.

After his victory against Saygid Izagakhmaev at UAE Warriors 15 with Dana White in attendance, he was signed by the UFC.

Ultimate Fighting Championship
Harris made his UFC debut against Christian Aguilera on May 8, 2021, at UFC on ESPN: Rodriguez vs. Waterson. He won the bout via technical submission due to an anaconda choke as he choked Aguilera in the first round. This fight earned him the Performance of the Night award.

Harris faced Impa Kasanganay on September 18, 2021, at UFC Fight Night 192. He won the fight via technical knockout in round one.

In this third fight with the promotion, Harris faced Shavkat Rakhmonov on February 5, 2022 at UFC Fight Night: Hermansson vs. Strickland. He lost the fight via knockout in round one.

Harris was scheduled to face Ramiz Brahimaj on February 18, 2023,  at UFC Fight Night 219.  However, Brahimaj was pulled from the event citing neck injury.

Harris was scheduled to face Abubakar Nurmagomedov on March 11, 2023, at UFC Fight Night 221.  However, Nurmagomedov withdrew from the bout due to an undisclosed reasons and was replaced by Jared Gooden. At the weigh-ins, Gooden weighed in at 177 pounds, six pounds over the welterweight non-title fight limit. The bout proceeded at catchweight and Gooden was fined 30% of his purse, which went to Harris. He won the fight via unanimous decision.

Championships and accomplishments
Ultimate Fighting Championship
Performance of the Night (one time) 
Brave Combat Federation
BRAVE CF Welterweight Championship (One time)

Mixed martial arts record

|-
|Win
|align=center|18–5
|Jared Gooden
|Decision (unanimous)
|UFC Fight Night: Yan vs. Dvalishvili
|
|align=center|3
|align=center|5:00
|Las Vegas, Nevada, United States
|
|-
|Loss
|align=center|17–5
|Shavkat Rakhmonov
|KO (spinning hook kick and punches)
|UFC Fight Night: Hermansson vs. Strickland
|
|align=center|1
|align=center|4:10
|Las Vegas, Nevada, United States
|
|-
| Win
| align=center| 17–4
| Impa Kasanganay
|TKO (punches)
|UFC Fight Night: Smith vs. Spann 
|
|align=center|1
|align=center|2:38
|Las Vegas, Nevada, United States
|
|-
| Win
| align=center| 16–4
| Christian Aguilera
| Technical Submission (anaconda choke)
| UFC on ESPN: Rodriguez vs. Waterson
| 
| align=center| 1
| align=center| 2:52
| Las Vegas, Nevada, United States
| 
|-
| Win
| align=center| 15–4
| Saygid Izagakhmaev
|Technical Submission (anaconda choke)
|UAE Warriors 15
|
|align=center|2
|align=center|2:36
|Abu Dhabi, United Arab Emirates
|  
|-
| Win
| align=center| 14–4
| Alex Santos
| KO (punch)
|Shooto Brazil 101
|
| align=center|2
| align=center|1:12
|Rio de Janeiro, Brazil
|
|-
| Win
| align=center| 13–4
| Claudio Rocha
| TKO (punches)
| Shooto Brazil 99
| 
| align=center| 1
| align=center| N/A
| Rio de Janeiro, Brazil
| 
|-
| Loss
| align=center| 12–4
| Jarrah Hussein Al-Silawi
| TKO (punches)
| Brave CF 16
| 
| align=center| 1
| align=center| 3:51
| Abu Dhabi, United Arab Emirates
| 
|-
| Win
| align=center| 12–3
| Carl Booth
|Decision (unanimous)
|Brave CF 8
|
|align=center| 3
|align=center| 5:00
|Curitiba, Brazil
|
|-
| Win
| align=center| 11–3
| Thiago Vieira
| TKO (punches)
| Brave CF 3
| 
| align=center| 2
| align=center| 1:04
| Curitiba, Brazil
|
|-
| Win
| align=center| 10–3
| Wellington Turman
|Decision (unanimous)
|Imortal FC 6
|
|align=center| 3
|align=center| 5:00
|Curitiba, Brazil
|
|-
| Win
| align=center| 9–3
| Wellington Vicente
| Submission (arm-triangle choke)
|Skull Fighting Championship 1
|
| align=center|1
| align=center|1:31
|Duque de Caxias, Brazil
|
|-
| Loss
| align=center|8–3
| Julio Cesar Andrade
|Decision (split)
|WOCS 43
|
|align=center|3
|align=center|5:00
|Rio de Janeiro, Brazil
|
|-
| Win
| align=center| 8–2
| Michel Pereira
|Decision (unanimous)
|XFC International 12
|
|align=center|3
|align=center|5:00
|São Paulo, Brazil
|
|-
| Win
| align=center| 7–2
| Paulo César
| Submission (brabo choke)
| XFC International 9
| 
| align=center| 1
| align=center| 4:03
| São Paulo, Brazil
| 
|-
| Win
| align=center| 6–2
| Ariel Jaeger
| Decision (unanimous)
| XFC International 7
| 
| align=center|3
| align=center|5:00
| São Paulo, Brazil
| 
|-
| Win
| align=center| 5–2
| Claudio Rocha
|Decision (unanimous)
|Cage Combat: Pro MMA 7
|
| align=center|3
| align=center|5:00
|Bonito, Brazil
|
|-
| Win
| align=center| 4–2
| Cleiton Prisco
| Decision (unanimous)
| Bitetti Combat 15
| 
| align=center|3
| align=center|5:00
| Rio de Janeiro, Brazil
|
|-
| Win
| align=center| 3–2
| Joilton Lutterbach
| Decision (unanimous)
| Bitetti Combat 14
| 
| align=center|3
| align=center|5:00
| Rio de Janeiro, Brazil
| 
|-
| Win
| align=center| 2–2
| Aldo Ocampos
| TKO (punches)
|Cage Combat: International Cage Combat 2
|
| align=center|3
| align=center|2:21
|Campo Grande, Brazil
|
|-
| Loss
| align=center| 1–2
| Fernando Bruno
|Decision (unanimous)
|Shooto Brazil 28
|
| align=center|3
| align=center|5:00
|Rio de Janeiro, Brazil
|
|-
| Win
| align=center| 1–1
| Bruno Renascer
|Submission (arm-triangle choke)
|Beija-Flor Fight Combat
|
| align=center|1
| align=center|2:16
|Nilópolis, Brazil
|
|-
| Loss
| align=center|0–1
| Christiano Marques
| Decision (split)
|Apocalypse Fighting Championship
|
|align=center|3
|align=center|5:00
|Passo Fundo, Brazil
|

See also 
 List of current UFC fighters
 List of male mixed martial artists

References

External links 
  
  

1987 births
Living people
Guyanese male mixed martial artists
Welterweight mixed martial artists
Mixed martial artists utilizing boxing
Mixed martial artists utilizing Luta Livre
Ultimate Fighting Championship male fighters
People from East Berbice-Corentyne
Guyanese expatriate sportspeople in Brazil
Guyanese expatriate sportspeople in the United States